Krisztina Triscsuk (born 17 July 1985) is a retired Russian-Hungarian handballer for Alba Fehérvár KC.

Club
On 14 May 2011, in her sixth season by Fehérvár KC, she surpassed Beatrix Balogh's all-time league scoring record, who hit the back of the net 643 times while playing for the Székesfehérvár-based club. Triscsuk entered the court against Veszprém with only one goal short to the previous record and managed thirteen goals, thus becoming the new league topscorer of Fehérvár.

International
As a youngster, Triscsuk played alongside Emiliya Turey, Lyudmila Postnova and Yekaterina Andryushina in the Russian youth national teams, however, she never made a full international appearance. Since 2004 Triscsuk lives in Hungary and in October 2012 she obtained the Hungarian citizenship. On 10 December 2012 she was called up to the Hungarian squad for the 2012 European Women's Handball Championship as a replacement for Melinda Vincze. Triscsuk made her debut a day later against Romania in a 25–19 victory, with that Hungary secured its place in the semi-finals of the European Championship.

Personal life 
Her husband was Evgeny Lushnikov, former handball player of Veszprém.

Achievements
European Championship:
Bronze Medalist: 2012
 Magyar Kupa:
Silver Medallist: 2006
Bronze Medallist: 2011
EHF Cup
Winner: 2016

Individual awards
Nemzeti Bajnokság I Topscorer: 2010/11, 2016/17

References

External links
Career statistics at Worldhandball

1985 births
Living people
People from Boksitogorsk
Russian female handball players
Hungarian female handball players
Russian expatriates in Hungary
Expatriate handball players
Naturalized citizens of Hungary
Fehérvár KC players
Hungarian people of Russian descent
Sportspeople from Leningrad Oblast